Gregory M. Auer (December 22, 1937 – June 12, 1993) was an American art director, screenwriter and cameraman. Manager of Special Effects for Warner Brothers Studio, he was best known for his work on Carrie (1976) and Star Wars Episode IV: A New Hope (1977).

References

American cinematographers
1937 births
1993 deaths
20th-century American screenwriters